Do Ab (also Romanized as Do Āb) is a village in Shuil Rural District, Rahimabad District, Rudsar County, Gilan Province, Iran. At the 2006 census, its population was 13, in 5 families.

References 

Populated places in Rudsar County